Stanley Steemer is an American company that provides carpet cleaning, tile and grout cleaning, upholstery cleaning, hardwood floor cleaning and air duct cleaning. The company also does water damage restoration and sells a line of cleaning products for home and office use. It was founded in 1947  in Dublin, Ohio. Still headquartered in Dublin, it has been a leading carpet cleaning business for 75 years.

The company has over 280 corporate-owned and franchised locations in 49 states.

In February 2013, Stanley Steemer earned Asthma and Allergy Friendly Certification for their professional cleaning services.

Sponsorship
The company sponsors the NASCAR "30-lap Stanley Steemer NASCAR Late Model" race held at Rockford Speedway in Rockford, Illinois.

References 

Franchises
Business services companies established in 1947
American companies established in 1947
Cleaning companies of the United States
Companies based in Dublin, Ohio
1947 establishments in Ohio